Florat Qerimi (born 30 July 1997), known professionally as Florat, is a Swiss-Albanian rapper and producer. He is the co-founder of the hip hop group and label MRM.

Early life 
Florat Qerimi was born on 30 July 1997 in Muri, Aargau, Switzerland. He is of Kosovo descent. His grandfather went to work in Switzerland in 1971, and took his family with him in 1990. Florat was born and raised in a tough neighborhood in Muri, infested with crime. However, he managed to avoid trouble and soon became interested in football and martial arts.

Career 
Florat's interest in hip hop music began by listening to hip hop artists such as Tupac Shakur and 50 Cent, and later R&B artists such as Chris Brown. He started to experiment with rhyming and rapping with his friends, with whom he would establish his record label MRM (an acronym for MoreMoney). Later, they set up a recording studio in a basement of one of the apartment blocks nearby where they recorded their first songs, "Vi me Benzo" and "Komm mit", which were produced by DJ A-Boom (who had previously worked with Kosovo-Albanian singers Noizy and Era Istrefi). "Vi me Benzo" and "Komm mit" proved successful, achieving nearly 1 million YouTube visits each, and expanding Florat's fanbase.

He made his debut live appearance on 8 June 2019 in a public event held Oberhausen, Germany. In this event, which was organized by the FC Prishtina ultras Plisat, Florat performed alongside Kosovo-Albanian rapper Tayna.

Florat's songs are played regularly by nightclubs in Kosovo and Albanian diaspora.

Discography

Singles

Notes

References 

1997 births
Living people
21st-century Albanian rappers
Albanian hip hop singers
Swiss people of Kosovan descent
Swiss male rappers
21st-century Swiss male musicians